Kenneth James "K.J." McDonald (November 28, 1930–October 4, 2012) was an American politician and businessman.

McDonald was born in Watertown, Minnesota. He went to Watertown High School and to vocational school in Chicago, Illinois. McDonald served in the United States Air Force during the Korean War and was an aerial photographer. McDonald was involved with the insurance business and was a photographer. He served in the Minnesota House of Representatives from 1977 to 1990 and was a Republican. McDonald served as mayor of Watertown from 2005 until his death in 2012. His son Joe McDonald currently serves in the Minnesota Legislature. McDonald died from a brain tumor in Watertown, Minnesota.

Notes

1930 births
2012 deaths
People from Watertown, Minnesota
Military personnel from Minnesota
Businesspeople from Minnesota
Farmers from Minnesota
Photographers from Minnesota
Mayors of places in Minnesota
Republican Party members of the Minnesota House of Representatives
Deaths from cancer in Minnesota
Deaths from brain cancer in the United States
20th-century American businesspeople